Betsy Driver (born 1964) is the mayor of Flemington, New Jersey, and an advocate for intersex human rights and awareness. She is the first openly intersex person to be elected to office in the United States.

Early life
Driver was born in Buffalo, New York, in 1964. She was born with congenital adrenal hyperplasia (CAH).

In her mid-30s, she began learning about intersex people and the surgeries she went through at eight months old. She has stated that she and her mother had been told that she was the only one to have this condition.

Career and advocacy
Driver was once a journalist and segment producer for CBS News. After joining groups for women with CAH, in 2001, she cofounded Bodies Like Ours, an online community forum for those with intersex variations. In 2003, Driver was appointed executive director of Bodies Like Ours. Driver and Emi Koyama, were credited for starting Intersex Awareness Day, which is observed on October 26 and is internationally recognized.

When Driver decided to run for a town council seat in Flemington in 2017, she learned that opponents planned to make an issue of her sexuality. She wrote an article about Intersex Awareness Day on her campaign Facebook page and the topic never became an issue during her campaign. In 2017, Driver was elected to Flemington town council, where she served for two years before being elected as mayor. She is the first openly intersex elected official in the United States, and the second worldwide after Australian Tony Briffa.

She was selected as a grand marshal for the 50th Pride Parade in Manhattan and recognized by Heritage of Pride as a community hero in 2019.

Driver became the mayor of Flemington, New Jersey, on January 2, 2019 after defeating incumbent mayor Phil Greiner by just 26 votes in the November 2018 election. After 1 term, she lost re-election to former State Senator Marcia A. Karrow by just 94 votes in 2022.

Personal life
Driver has lived in Flemington since 2007 with her wife and their two sons.

References

https://www.nj.com/hunterdon/2020/10/nj-mayor-will-not-resign-amid-backlash-from-anti-trump-facebook-post.html

Living people
1964 births
Intersex women
Intersex politicians
Intersex rights in the United States
New Jersey Democrats
People from Flemington, New Jersey
Mayors of places in New Jersey
Women mayors of places in New Jersey
21st-century LGBT people
21st-century American women